John Cassini (born in Toronto) is a Canadian actor.

Career 
Cassini appeared in the 1995 Brad Pitt film Seven. He starred in the 2005 film Cool Money. Cassini starred as Ronnie Delmarco on the CBC series Intelligence, which was cancelled on March 7, 2008.

He guest-starred in the CW series Arrow and on the USA network original series Motive in April 2016.

Cassini appeared in and is listed as a producer of  the film Guido Superstar: The Rise of Guido, starring, produced, and directed by Silvio Pollio, including, Nicholas Lea, Terry Chen, and Michael Eklund. The film screened at the 2010 Vancouver International Film Festival.

Filmography

Film

Television

References

External links
John Cassini website

Living people
Year of birth missing (living people)
Canadian male film actors
Canadian male television actors
Canadian male voice actors
Canadian people of Italian descent
Italian male film actors
Italian male television actors
Male actors from Toronto
21st-century Canadian male actors